Todd Hill is a bluff type elevation (1,245 m) which forms the south extremity of the Briggs Hill massif and the north point of entrance to Descent Pass (leading to Ferrar Glacier), in Victoria Land. Named in 1992 by Advisory Committee on Antarctic Names (US-ACAN) after Ronald L. Todd, cartographer, United States Geological Survey (USGS); member of the USGS field team which established geodetic control in the Hudson Mountains, Jones Mountains, Thurston Island and Farwell Island areas of Walgreen Coast and Eights Coast during the 1968–69 season.

Hills of Victoria Land
Scott Coast